Alfred Kim is a Korean operatic tenor. With The Royal Opera, Kim sang the role of Calaf in Puccini's Turandot in 2014.

Awards
In 1997, Kim won the International Belvedere Singing Competition in Vienna, and in 1998 he won the ARD International Music Competition in Munich.

References

Living people
Operatic tenors
South Korean male singers
South Korean opera singers
Year of birth missing (living people)